Leuconitocris tibialis is a species of beetle in the family Cerambycidae. It was described by Kolbe in 1893, originally under the genus Nitocris. It contains the varietas Leuconitocris tibialis var. holoflava.

References

Leuconitocris
Beetles described in 1893